Follicular hybrid cyst (also known as a "Hybrid cyst")is a cutaneous condition characterized by a cyst composed of several adnexal components.

See also 
 Apocrine nevus
 List of cutaneous conditions

References 

Epidermal nevi, neoplasms, and cysts